The Big Noise is a lost 1928 American silent comedy film directed by Allan Dwan and starring Chester Conklin, Alice White and Bodil Rosing.

Cast
 Chester Conklin as John Sloval  
 Alice White as Sophie Sloval  
 Bodil Rosing as Ma Sloval  
 Sam Hardy as Philip Hurd  
 Jack Egan as Bill Hedges  
 Ned Sparks as William Howard  
 David Torrence as Managing Editor

References

Bibliography
 Frederic Lombardi. Allan Dwan and the Rise and Decline of the Hollywood Studios. McFarland, 2013.

External links

1928 films
1928 comedy films
Silent American comedy films
Lost American films
Films directed by Allan Dwan
American silent feature films
1920s English-language films
American black-and-white films
First National Pictures films
1928 lost films
Lost comedy films
1920s American films